The Colonial Athletic Association men's basketball tournament is the conference championship tournament in basketball for the Colonial Athletic Association. The tournament has been held every year since at least 1980; for the 1979-80 to 1984-85 seasons the conference was known as the ECAC South. It is a single-elimination tournament and seeding is based on regular season records. The winner, declared conference champion, receives the conference's automatic bid to the NCAA basketball tournament.

Results

Championships and finals appearances by school

‡Former member of the CAA

Broadcasters

Television

Radio

See also

Colonial Athletic Association women's basketball tournament

References

 
Recurring sporting events established in 1980
1980 establishments in the United States